Soknedal is a village in Midtre Gauldal municipality in Trøndelag county, Norway. The village is located along the river Sokna which flows north and later joins the river Gaula.

The village of Soknedal was the administrative centre of the old municipality of Soknedal which existed from 1841 until 1964.  Soknedal Church is located in the village.

References

Midtre Gauldal
Former municipalities of Norway